Lisa Marie Stoia (born August 28, 1982) is an American soccer midfielder who last played for Saint Louis Athletica of Women's Professional Soccer.

References

External links
 Saint Louis Athletica player profile
 West Virginia player profile
 West Virginia coaching profile

Living people
Saint Louis Athletica players
West Virginia Mountaineers women's soccer players
1982 births
Women's association football midfielders
Sportspeople from New York (state)
People from Shirley, New York
American women's soccer players
American people of Italian descent
Women's Professional Soccer players
USL W-League (1995–2015) players
Boston Renegades players